Spears is an English surname. Notable people with the surname include:

Aries Spears (born 1975), American actor and comedian
Billie Jo Spears (1937–2011), American country singer
Britney Spears (born 1981), American pop singer
Frank Sydney Spears (1906–1991), a South African artist and designer
Jamie Lynn Spears (born 1991), American actress, singer, and younger sister of Britney Spears
Ken Spears (1938–2020), American animator, writer, television producer and sound editor
Kendra Spears (born 1988), American fashion model
Lynne Spears (born 1955), mother of Britney and Jamie Lynn Spears
Edward Spears, Bt, KBE (1886–1974), British army officer, MP and author
Marcel Spears Jr. (born 1997), American football player
Marcus Spears (offensive tackle) (born 1971), NFL footballer
Marcus Spears (defensive end) (born 1983), NFL footballer
Monroe K. Spears (1916–1998), American university professor
Randy Spears (born 1961), American former pornographic actor
Rick Spears, American comics writer
Shawn Spears (born 1981), Canadian professional wrestler born Ronnie Arneill and also known as Gavin Spears
Tony Spears (born 1965), rugby league footballer who played in the 1980s
Tyjae Spears (born 2001), American football player
Warren Spears (1954–2005), American dancer and choreographer

See also
Speers (disambiguation)
Spear (surname)